Syed Muzaffar Hussain (born 26 August 1966) is an Indian National Congress politician from Mira Bhainder City located in Thane district who has twice served on the Legislative Council for the state of Maharashtra. He was elected as Corporator to the Mira-Bhayander Municipal Council in 1991. He served as First Deputy Mayor of Mira Bhayandar City when Municipal Corporation was formed. He is currently Parliamentary Board Member of Maharashtra Pradesh Congress Committee. Known for his oratory skills he has won Best Parliamentarian, Best Speaker Award by President of India Smt. Pratibatai Patil.

Hussain is an agriculturist, a philanthropist, Real Estate Developer and a businessman by profession, and has helped fund construction of many projects in the district of Thane that have included parks and hospitals, cremation and burial grounds. He was initially elected to the legislative council first in 2004, where he served until 2009 and later from 2010 to 2016. He is Former Youth Congress President of Maharashtra.

Hussain was appointed as one of working presidents along with four others before Maharashtra Legislative Assembly Election of 2019  for the Maharashtra State Congress Committee.

Political career 
Muzaffar Hussain started his political journey as a Youth Congress worker in 1985. He subsequently was elected as Corporator and went on to become First Deputy Mayor of Mira Bhayandar Municipal Corporation after its inception in 2002. Later he was twice elected as  Member of the Legislative Council (MLC). Known for his Organisational Skills he was appointed as Working President of Maharashtra Pradesh Congress Committee in 2019. Trustee of many Charitable Trusts and Associations which primarily focuses on healthcare, sports, agriculture, education and charity.

References

1966 births
Living people
Indian National Congress politicians from Maharashtra
Members of the Maharashtra Legislative Council